A Journey to London is a 1975 British comedy television film directed by Gareth Davies and starring Bill Maynard, Joan Sims and John Curless. It is based on the restoration comedy play by John Vanbrugh.

Plot summary
Sir Francis Headpiece takes his family to London.

Cast
 Robin Bailey ...  Sir Charles 
 Trevor Bannister ...  Colonel Courtly 
 Anthony Collin ...  John 
 Margaret Courtenay ...  Mrs. Motherly 
 John Curless ...  Squire Humphrey Headpiece 
 Jenny Donnison ...  Trusty 
 Jan Francis ...  Martilla 
 Sarah Grazebrook ...  Deborah 
 Freddie Jones ...  Lord Loverule 
 Helen Lindsay ...  Lady Arabella 
 Bill Maynard ...  Sir Francis Headpiece 
 Clive Merrison ...  Captain Toupee 
 Julie Peasgood ...  Miss Betty Headpiece 
 Joan Sims ...  Lady Headpiece 
 Pam St. Clement ...  Doll Tripe 
 Raymond Witch ...  Shortyard

References

External links

British television films
1975 television films
1975 films
ITV (TV network) original programming
Films set in London
1970s English-language films